Burgbrohl is a municipality in the district of Ahrweiler, in Rhineland-Palatinate, Germany.

People 
 Felix Genn (born 1950), Roman Catholic bishop

References

Populated places in Ahrweiler (district)